Medium-speed vehicle (MSV) is a vehicle registration category in some states of the United States where applicable vehicles are allowed to travel on roads at speeds up to . The safety regulations for MSVs are more stringent than those for Low-speed vehicles.

Montana's SB0185 was the first law to define this class of vehicle. Maryland's law considers the speed capability of the particular vehicle.

See also
Neighborhood Electric Vehicle

References 

Vehicle law
Medium-speed vehicles